AZS Koszalin is a Polish basketball team, based in Koszalin. AZS currently plays in the I Liga, the second tier Polish basketball league.

History
The AZS Koszalin sports club was founded on 8 October 1968. The founding fathers participating in the meeting, together with invited guests, decided that the creation of a sports club was vital and would contribute to the sports life of the city. The emergence of the AZS Koszalin sports club was supposed to fill in the geographic gap that existed in the region between Gdańsk and Szczecin.

It was assumed that the newly founded club would take part in actively promoting sports and physical education among students. The accepted action plan for the areas of work for the AZS was based on the development of traditional academic team disciplines as well as on occasionally performed individual disciplines. In the beginnings of its existence the club had many active subsections including: volleyball, basketball, swimming, athletics, badminton and judo.

Throughout its growing process, the AZS started to co-operate with local schools in Koszalin. The effects of this co-operation were many successes of local teams on a national and even international scale. Alumni of these schools were known Olympic athletes as well as athletes representing Poland internationally (the Wołujewiczówny sisters, Leszek Doliński, Dariusz Zelig, Wiesława Reut, Ryszard Razik, Krzysztof Janicki, Wioleta Gawęcka, Małgorzata Janowicz and others).

Ultimately the AZS focuses mainly on their men's basketball team, slowly moving away from their women's basketball team, which has stopped competing since 1999.

At the present time, the club's entire attention is focused on the first team. The training of children and youngsters is limited leading to giving up this field of activity. Focusing entirely on the first team results in the team's advance to the first league and following that to the ekstraklasa league.

Logos

Current roster

Notable players

Oded Brandwein (born 1988), Israeli-Polish basketball player for  Maccabi Tel Aviv of the Euroleague and the Israeli Basketball Premier League

Season by season

References

External links
Official site 
Official site Fans 
AZS on PLK.pl 
Team Profile on Eurobasket.com

Sport in Koszalin
Basketball teams in Poland